Thomas Henry Hatchell  was Archdeacon of Leighlin from 1899 until 1922.

Hatchell was educated at Trinity College, Dublin. was ordained in 1854. He served curacies in Killabban; Hacketstown; Clonegal; Thomastown and Staplestown where he became the Incumbent in 1871. He was Treasurer of  Leighlin Cathedral from 1888 to 1899.

References

Archdeacons of Leighlin
Alumni of Trinity College Dublin
19th-century Irish Anglican priests
20th-century Irish Anglican priests